Ahmad Sa'adat (also transliterated from Arabic as Ahmed Sadat / Saadat; ; born 1953), also known as Abu Ghassan, is a Palestinian militant and Secretary-General of the Popular Front for the Liberation of Palestine (PFLP), a Marxist–Leninist Palestinian nationalist organisation. Sa'adat graduated in 1975 from the UNRWA Teachers College, Ramallah, specializing in Mathematics. Sa'adat was elected General Secretary of the PFLP by its Central Committee in October 2001, to succeed Abu Ali Mustafa, after Mustafa was assassinated by Israel during the Second Intifada.

Sa'adat had spent 10 years in Israeli prisons, on eight separate occasions. He was accused by Israel of organizing the assassination of the Israeli Tourism Minister, Rehavam Ze'evi, and took refuge in the Muqata'a headquarters of PLO leader Yassir Arafat, which was then besieged by Israel after Arafat refused to hand him over to Israel. As part of an agreement with Israel, Sa'adat was tried by the Palestinian National Authority (PNA) and imprisoned in Jericho prison in 2002. In the Palestinian elections of January 2006, Sa'adat was elected to the Palestinian Legislative Council. On 14 March 2006, Hamas announced their intention to release Sa'adat from prison. The US and British team monitoring Jericho prison left, citing poor security conditions. On the same day, Israeli forces carried out the so-called Operation Bringing Home the Goods, taking Sa'adat and five other security prisoners into custody. On 25 December he was given a 30-year prison sentence by an Israeli military court. He was held in solitary confinement in an Israeli prison and his health deteriorated after frequent hunger strikes, in protest of Israel. Since 2012 Sa'adat is no longer in solitary confinement.

Political views 
Sa'adat is a Marxist–Leninist, and is the General Secretary of the Popular Front for the Liberation of Palestine (PFLP), in the context of the Israeli–Palestinian conflict Sa'adat persistently claims that a one state solution is the only possible solution for the conflict, he holds that "The solution is the one-state solution and not the two-state solution," Saadat said: "There are no other horizons for any other settlement." Sa'adat also holds that "The communist forces in the Arab world have applied the viewpoints of the Soviet Union by the book and have never developed their own theoretical and political 'flavor'”.

Imprisonment by Palestinian Authority
Sa'adat was accused by Israel of organizing the assassination of the Israeli Tourism Minister, Rehavam Ze'evi, who was killed on 17 October 2001. He took refuge in the Muqata'a headquarters of PLO leader Yasser Arafat, who refused to hand him over to Israel, leading to an Israeli siege.

After negotiations involving the UK and US, an agreement (sometimes called the "Jericho Deal") was reached between Israel and the Palestinian National Authority. Israel called off the siege of the Muqata'a on 2 May 2002, and Sa'adat and four members of the PFLP implicated in Ze'evi's killing (Basel al-Asmar, 'Ahed Abu Ghalma, Majdi al-Rimawi and Hamdi Quran) were arrested by the PNA. Sa'adat was tried in a Palestinian court while the other four were given a military trial. All were then held in the Palestinian prison in Jericho, with American and British monitors overseeing their captivity. Sa'adat was not allowed to run for political office, give interviews or address the public, although these bans were occasionally circumvented or ignored.

The Palestinian Supreme Court declared that Sa'adat's imprisonment was unconstitutional, and ordered his release, but the PNA has refused to comply. Amnesty International has declared that this, and the fact that he received an unfair trial, makes his detention illegal, and that he must either be charged with a crime and given due process, or released.

At the 2006 Palestinian election, Sa'adat was elected to the Palestinian National Council and Hamas formed government. Hamas announced its intention to release Ze'evi's assassins.

Imprisonment by Israel
On 14 March 2006, the American and British monitors were withdrawn from the Jericho prison where Sa'adat and five other security prisoners were being held citing lack of security, and Israeli forces then launched Operation Bringing Home the Goods, surrounding the prison to prevent the escape of the security prisoners, including Sa'adat. In the ensuing stand-off, Palestinian guards left the prison but 200 prisoners refused to surrender. A ten-hour standoff ensued, with Israeli soldiers besieging the prison and clashing with Palestinian Authority security personnel, as Sa'adat and five other prisoners barricaded themselves inside. During the course of the standoff, two Palestinian security officers were killed and 28 wounded, and Sa'adat eventually ordered his men to lay down their arms and surrender.

Israeli military forces took Sa'adat and the other five security prisoners into custody. On 25 December 2008, an Israeli military court sentenced Sa'adat to 30 years in prison for heading an "illegal terrorist organization" and for his responsibility for all actions carried out by his organization, particularly for the murder of Rehavam Ze'evi. The judges said:

There is no doubt that the accused controls the PFLP. When we consider the appropriate sentence for someone who headed a murderous terrorist organization, we take into account not only his position, but his actions as well.  The offenses the accused has been convicted of indicate that he initiated and participated in military activity with the aim of killing innocent people.

There was speculation that Hamas was attempting to include Sa'adat among the Palestinian prisoners released in the October 2011 Gilad Shalit prisoner exchange. Israel refused to include Sa'adat in the final deal.

Sa'adat was placed in solitary confinement. In 2010, the Israeli Supreme Court refused an appeal by Sadaat to be let out of solitary confinement, accepting the prosecution's claim that there was evidence Sa'adat had sent messages to terrorist operatives from within prison.

On 27 September 2011, Sa'adat and other members of the PFLP (hundreds according to an Amnesty International report) held in Israeli prisons began a hunger strike to protest against worsening Israeli prison policies and solitary confinement.

The hunger strike was overshadowed by the deal agreed between Hamas and Israel for the release of over 1,000 Palestinian prisoners in exchange for captured soldier Gilad Shalit. The prisoners' swap deal left out Sa'adat.

Sa'adat and the other PFLP prisoners ended their hunger strike on 17 October 2011, the 21st day of the hunger strike, after Israeli prison authorities agreed to end solitary confinements.

Family
Sa'adat is married to Abla Saadat, and together they have four children, two boys and two girls.

References

External links 
 Interview with Ahmed Sa'adat – Ma'an News, 3 January 2006.
 Letter from Ahmad Saadat at Jericho Prison

1954 births
Living people
People of the Israeli–Palestinian conflict
Anti-revisionists
Popular Front for the Liberation of Palestine members
Palestinian communists
Palestinian people imprisoned by Israel
People convicted on terrorism charges
People imprisoned on charges of terrorism
Members of the 2006 Palestinian Legislative Council